Admiral Lee may refer to:

Fitzhugh Lee III (1905−1992), American vice admiral
FitzRoy Henry Lee (1699−1750), British vice admiral
Kent Lee (1923−2017), American vice admiral
Phillip Lee Jr., American chaplain and rear admiral
Richard Lee (Royal Navy officer) (1765−1837), British admiral
Robert C. Lee (1888−1971), rear admiral
Samuel Phillips Lee (1812−1897), American rear admiral
Willis Augustus Lee (1888−1945), American vice admiral
Lee Chung-wei, Taiwanese vice admiral
Lee Hsi-ming, Taiwanese admiral
Lee Jye, Taiwanese admiral
John Lee-Barber (1905−1995), British rear admiral
Charles Vaughan-Lee (1867−1928), British rear admiral